The 1925 Indiana Hoosiers football team represented the Indiana Hoosiers in the 1925 Big Ten Conference football season. The Hoosiers played their home games at Memorial Stadium in Bloomington, Indiana. The team was coached by Bill Ingram, in his third and final year as head coach.

The dedication game occurred later in the season against Purdue.

Schedule

References

Indiana
Indiana Hoosiers football seasons
Indiana Hoosiers football